David A. Prior (October 24, 1955 – August 16, 2015) was an American director, screenwriter, and producer. Prior started his career with the horror film Sledgehammer (1983), and the action film Killzone (1985). Shortly after, he co-founded Action International Pictures (AIP), his first directorial effort with this enterprise were Deadly Prey, Aerobicide, and Mankillers released in 1987. Subsequently, Prior made action films until the late 1990s.

From 2000 to 2006, Prior went on a hiatus. From 2007 to his death in 2015, he continued directing films including Lost at War (2007), Zombie Wars (2008), Night Claws (2012), Deadliest Prey (2013), and Relentless Justice (2015).

Career

1983-1985: Early films 
In 1983, Prior made his directorial debut with the horror film Sledgehammer. Katie Rife of The A.V. Club said the film "has the distinction of being the first shot-on-video slasher movie. That film established patterns that would persist throughout Prior’s career, namely, extremely low budgets, hammy dialogue, outrageous action, and, most importantly, the presence of his brother Ted".

In 1985, he directed the action film Killzone.

1987-1999: Action and horror film director 
Around this time Prior met by veteran producer, and director David Winters and with him the founded Action International Pictures also known as AIP. In 1987, Prior's directorial efforts that AIP released were the horror film Killer Workout, the action films Deadly Prey, and Mankillers. The made for VHS film gained a second audience two decades later as cult film that found its way on the internet.

In 1988, he directed Operation Warzone, an American Vietnam War film, Night Wars and Death Chase.

In 1989, he directed Rapid Fire, Future Force a science-fiction film starring David Carradine, and Hell on the Battleground.

In 1990, he is credited as the director of following films White Fury, Invasion Force, The Lost Platoon, Lock 'n' Load, Invasion Force, Future Zone,(Future Force's sequel) and The Final Sanction. That year, he was credited with the screenplays for Born Killer and Deadly Dancer.

In 1991, he produced Dark Rider and The Last Ride. That year, he wrote and directed Raw Nerve.

In 1992, he wrote and directed the film Center of the Web, starring Robert Davi, Tony Curtis, Charlene Tilton, and Charles Napier. He also produced Armed for Action and Blood on the Badge, both starring Joe Estevez.

In 1993, AIP was rebranded West Side Studios, to signal that the company would work with bigger budgets and become more mainstream. With the advancements of the company, Prior directed two films. One of them is Double Threat, with Sally Kirkland and Andrew Stevens. The other horror-thriller film Night Trap (which won a Gold Award at the WorldFest Houston for best Fantasy/Horror), starring Robert Davi.

In 1994, he directed the thriller Raw Justice (which won a Bronze Award at the WorldFest Charleston for best Theatrical Feature Film – Dramatic), starring Pamela Anderson, David Keith, and Robert Hays.

In 1995, he directed Felony and Mutant Species. Also that year he wrote Codename: Silencer.

In 1997, he produced The P.A.C.K..

In 1999, he directed Hostile Environment with Brigitte Nielsen, Matthias Hues, and Darren Shahlavi.

2000 to 2015: Hiatus and final projects 
From 2000 to 2006, Prior was on an hiatus.

In 2007, Prior returned to directing with Lost at War.

On March 15, 2009, Prior's Zombie Wars, a zombie apocalypse film, screened at the first Paranoia Horror Film Festival.

He also wrote the screenplay of The One Warrior released in 2011.

In 2012, he directed the bigfoot horror film Night Claws, starring Reb Brown.

In 2013, he wrote and directed Deadliest Prey, a sequel to Deadly Prey. On making a sequel, Ted said that he and David "decided to do a sequel based on fan mail, screenings, and all that stuff. I’ve talked to lot of fans of the movie, and after having all kinds of ideas thrown at us, Dave and I have decided to stick to the basic formula as the original. Fast pace and hard hitting."

In 2015, he was as writer for the screenplay of David Winters's Dancin': It's On!. Also he wrote and directed Relentless Justice the film starring Leilani Sarelle.

Death 
Prior died on August 16, 2015 at the age of 59. His death was described by his brother Ted as "a long battle of failing health".

Filmography

References

Works Cited 

 Dendle, Peter (2012). The Zombie Movie Encyclopedia: Volume 2, 2000-2010.  North Carolina: McFarland Publishing. .
 Budnik, Daniel R. (2017). '80s Action Movies on the Cheap. North Carolina: McFarland & Company Inc.

External links
 

Film directors from New Jersey
American film directors
American film producers
American male screenwriters
1955 births
2015 deaths